The France men's national squash team represents France in international squash team competitions, and is governed by the French Squash Federation.

Since 1981, France has participated in two finals of the World Squash Team Open.

Current team 
 Grégory Gaultier
 Grégoire Marche
 Mathieu Castagnet
 Lucas Serme
 Baptiste Masotti
 Victor Crouin

Results

World Team Squash Championships

European Squash Team Championships

See also 
 French Squash Federation
 World Team Squash Championships
 France women's national squash team

References

External links 
 Team France

Squash teams
Men's national squash teams
Squash
Squash in France
Men's sport in France